Lord Moore may refer to:

 Philip Moore, Baron Moore of Wolvercote (1921–2009), Private Secretary to Queen Elizabeth II from 1977 to 1986
 John Moore, Baron Moore of Lower Marsh (1937–2019), British politician, cabinet minister under Margaret Thatcher
 Charles Moore, Baron Moore of Etchingham (born 1956), British journalist, former editor of The Daily Telegraph, The Spectator and The Sunday Telegraph